Chase Buchanan and Tennys Sandgren won the title, beating Peter Polansky and Adil Shamasdin 3–6, 6–4, [10–5]

Seeds

Draw

Main draw

References
 Main Draw
 Qualifying Draw

Charlottesville Men's Pro Challenger – Doubles
2015 Doubles
Charlottesville